The Canadian Baptist Mission (CBM) is an international Baptist Christian missionary society. It is a constituent board affiliated with the Canadian Baptist Ministries.

History
It was established in 1850 by the Canadian Baptist Ministries.  The CBM was founded at the initiative of Thomas Gabriel which gave the impetus to the Canadian Baptists to embark on overseas missions.

In India, the Canadian Baptist Mission work was spread in Andhra Pradesh and Odisha.  In the postcolonial era, four societies were formed to take over the work of the CBM in India based on linguistic basis.

References

Further reading
 
 

Baptist missionary societies
Religious organizations established in 1850
1850 establishments in Canada
Baptist Christianity in Canada